Rubenis (feminine: Rubene) is a Latvian surname, derived from the Latvian word for "black grouse". Individuals with the surname include:

Juris Rubenis (born 1961), Lutheran pastor;
Mārtiņš Rubenis (born 1978), luger
Artūrs Visockis-Rubenis (born 1985). basketball coach 

Latvian-language masculine surnames